Ipubi is a city  in the state of Pernambuco, Brazil. The population in 2020, according with IBGE was 31,187 inhabitants and the total area is 693.91 km².

Geography
 State - Pernambuco
 Region - Sertão Pernambucano
 Boundaries - Ceará state    (N);  Ouricuri    (S);  Bodocó   (E);   Araripina and Trindade   (W).
 Area - 665.62 km²
 Elevation - 535 m
 Hydrography - Brigida River
 Vegetation - Caatinga
 Climate - semi arid - (Sertão) hot
 Annual average temperature - 24.8 c
 Distance to Recife - 665.8 km

Economy
The main economic activities in Ipubi are based in industry and agribusiness, especially creation of cattle, sheep, pigss, goats, horses, chickens; and plantations of manioc (over 35,000 tons).

Economic indicators

Economy by sector
2006

Health indicators

References

Municipalities in Pernambuco